Invisible Opponent (German: Unsichtbare Gegner) is a 1933 German-Austrian drama film directed by Rudolph Cartier and starring Gerda Maurus, Paul Hartmann, and Oskar Homolka. The film's sets were designed by the art director Erwin Scharf. The plot revolves around an oil swindle in a South American country. The film was made at the Sievering Studios in Vienna. The critics were not generally impressed with the film, the Deutsche Allgemeine Zeitung described it as "unbelievable and unbelievably awful picture".

A separate French-language version The Oil Sharks was also released.

Cast
 Gerda Maurus as Sybil Herford  
 Paul Hartmann as Peter Ugron  
 Oskar Homolka as James Godfrey  
 Peter Lorre as Henry Pless  
 Paul Kemp as Hans Mertens  
 Raoul Aslan as J. Delmonte  
 Leonard Steckel as Santos  
 H. Kyser as Sir Thomas  
 Eva Schmid-Kayser as Eva Ugron  
 Jaro Fürth 
 John Mylong 
 Otto Schmöle
 Franke 
 Maria Holst 
 Josef Rehberger 
 Wilhelm Stauffen 
 Mihail Xantho

References

Bibliography 
 Youngkin, Stephen. The Lost One: A Life of Peter Lorre. University Press of Kentucky, 2005.

External links 
 

1933 films
Films of the Weimar Republic
Austrian drama films
German drama films
1933 drama films
1930s German-language films
Films directed by Rudolph Cartier
Films set in South America
German multilingual films
Films about con artists
German black-and-white films
Austrian black-and-white films
1933 multilingual films
1930s German films
Films shot at Sievering Studios